Francisco "Kiko" Femenía Far (born 2 February 1991) is a Spanish professional footballer who plays as a right-back for La Liga club Villarreal.

Club career

Hércules

Born in Sanet y Negrals, Province of Alicante, Valencian Community, Femenía was a product of Hércules CF's youth ranks. He made his first-team debut on 15 June 2008 at just 17, appearing in a Segunda División match at Cádiz CF, a 1–1 draw which eventually certified the Andalusians' relegation even though they protested against the illegal fielding of an opposing player, specifically the youngster.

Femenía played another game with the main squad in the 2008–09 season, again in the last round but against UD Salamanca (5–1 away win). In the subsequent off-season, he signed his first professional contract after agreeing to a five-year deal and, the following campaign, still only 18, he would be a much more important midfield unit, being the first substitute for veteran Francisco Rufete and totalling nearly 1,000 minutes in the league to help the club return to La Liga after an absence of 13 years.

On 28 August 2010, Femenía made his debut in the top division, replacing Abel Aguilar in the second half of the home fixture against Athletic Bilbao. After only a few minutes on the pitch, however, and a couple of poor decisions, he suffered an anxiety attack from which he later fully recovered, although the Basques eventually won it 1–0.

Barcelona
Femenía joined FC Barcelona Atlètic on 6 July 2011, for €2 million plus €1.5 million in add-ons. He scored his first official goal for his new team on 4 September, opening the score in a 4–0 away victory over FC Cartagena.

Femenía netted five times in 30 games – 23 starts – in his first season, helping the Catalans to the eighth position.

Real Madrid
In late August 2013, Femenía was released by Barcelona, stating that he had been "ruined emotionally". Just hours later, he signed for Real Madrid, being assigned to the reserves in the second division.

Femenía appeared in only five matches during the whole campaign, which ended in relegation, and left the club in December 2014.

Alcorcón
On 7 January 2015, Femenía signed a six-month deal with AD Alcorcón also of the second tier. He totalled 996 minutes of action during the season, helping his team finish 11th.

Alavés
On 2 July 2015, Femenía moved to fellow league side Deportivo Alavés after agreeing to a one-year contract. He contributed 38 appearances and five goals in his debut campaign as they returned to the top flight after ten years, and was eventually reconverted into a right-back.

Femenía left the Mendizorrotza Stadium on 6 June 2017, as his contract was due to expire.

Watford
On 1 July 2017, Femenía signed for Watford after agreeing to a four-year deal. He made his debut in the Premier League on 12 August, coming on for injured Daryl Janmaat early into a 3–3 home draw against Liverpool.

Femenía scored his first league goal for the English club on 31 March 2018, helping the hosts earn one point after a 2–2 home draw with Bournemouth.

Villarreal
On 28 July 2022, aged 31, Femenía returned to Spain after five years and joined Villarreal CF on a three-year contract, for an undisclosed fee.

Career statistics

Honours
Alavés
Segunda División: 2015–16

Watford
FA Cup runner-up: 2018–19

References

External links

1991 births
Living people
People from Marina Alta
Sportspeople from the Province of Alicante
Spanish footballers
Footballers from the Valencian Community
Association football defenders
Association football midfielders
La Liga players
Segunda División players
Divisiones Regionales de Fútbol players
Hércules CF B players
Hércules CF players
FC Barcelona Atlètic players
Real Madrid Castilla footballers
AD Alcorcón footballers
Deportivo Alavés players
Villarreal CF players
Premier League players
English Football League players
Watford F.C. players
FA Cup Final players
Spain youth international footballers
Spanish expatriate footballers
Expatriate footballers in England
Spanish expatriate sportspeople in England